Show Time is the sixth album and first live album by guitarist Ry Cooder, produced by Cooder and released on the Warner Bros. record label in January 1977.

Track listing
Side A
"School Is Out" (Frank Guida, Gary Anderson, Gene Barge, Joseph Royster) – 2:37
"Alimony" (Brenda Lee Jones, Robert Higginbotham, Welton Young) – 4:44
"Jesus on the Mainline" (Traditional; adapted by Ry Cooder) – 5:27
"The Dark End of the Street" (Chips Moman, Dan Penn) – 6:43
Side B
"Viva Seguin/Do Re Mi" (Santiago Jiménez, Woody Guthrie) – 5:24
"Volver, Volver" (Ray Maldonado) – 4:49
"How Can a Poor Man Stand Such Times and Live?" (Blind Alfred Reed) – 6:40
"Smack Dab in the Middle" (Charles E. Calhoun) – 8:00

Personnel

Musicians
Ry Cooder – electric guitar, vocals, arrangements
Flaco Jiménez – accordion
Bobby King – vocals
Terry Evans – vocals
Eldridge King – vocals
Pat Rizzo – alto saxophone
Jesse Ponce – bajo sexto
Henry "Big Red" Ojeda – bass
Isaac Garcia – drums

References

Ry Cooder albums
1977 live albums
Albums produced by Ry Cooder